Liolaemus inti is a species of lizard in the family  Liolaemidae. It is native to Argentina.

References

inti
Reptiles described in 2008
Reptiles of Argentina
Taxa named by Cristian Simón Abdala
Taxa named by Andrés Sebastián Quinteros